Hugo Alfredo Anzorreguy Recobiche (born July 10, 1938) was the Secretary of Intelligence of the Argentine Republic from January 30, 1990 to December 10, 1999, during most of Carlos Menem's presidency. At nine years, Anzorreguy was the longest serving Secretary of Intelligence, and was the head of SIDE during some of its most scandalous years.

Anzorreguy was born in the city of Buenos Aires, where he studied to be a lawyer. He is currently indicted in the AMIA Bombing case for tampering with evidence.

See also 
 List of Argentine Secretaries of Intelligence

External links 
 Anzorreguy's declaration in the AMIA Bombing case

1938 births
Argentine Secretaries of Intelligence
Living people
People from Buenos Aires